Kytice z pověstí národních (A Bouquet of Folk Legends), also known by the short title Kytice (Czech for bouquet), is a collection of ballads by the Czech author Karel Jaromír Erben. The collection was first published in 1853 and was originally made up of 12 poems. Lilie was added to the second edition in 1861.
  
  (Treasure)
  (The Wedding Shirts)
  (Lady midday)
  (The Golden Spinning-Wheel)
  (Christmas Eve)
  (Little Dove)
  (Záhoř's Bed)
  (The Water-Goblin)
  (Willow)
  (Lily) 
  (Daughter's Curse)
  (Seeress)

Translations

There are two full translations into English in print, Marcela Sulak (2012), A Bouquet of Czech Folktales, Prague, Twisted Spoon Press, and Susan Reynolds (2012), Kytice, London, Jantar Publishing.

Marcela Sulak's translation has been used for subtitling performances of Dvořák's adaptations in Prague and the film version at the Warsaw Film Festival. The edition is illustrated with artwork by Alén Diviš.

Susan Reynolds' translations were years in the making; she had read some of her translations at a symposium at the Antonin Dvořák Museum in Prague in 2004, which were lauded as "brilliant".

Adaptations
The Kytice collection has inspired several adaptations for various media:
Films
 Kytice (Wild Flowers), a 2000 Czech drama film directed by F. A. Brabec depicting 7 of the poems: Kytice, Vodník, Svatební košile, Polednice, Zlatý kolovrat, Dceřina kletba, Štědrý den
 Svatební košile, a 1978 Czech animated short directed by Josef Kábrt
 Svatební košile, a 1925 Czech film directed by and starring Theodor Pištěk

Music
 Svatební košile (The Spectre's Bride), Ballad for soprano, tenor, bass, chorus and orchestra, Op. 69, B. 135 (1884) by Antonín Dvořák
 Svatební košile (The Spectre's Bride), Ballad for soprano, tenor, bass, mixed chorus and orchestra, H. 214 I A (1932) by Bohuslav Martinů
 Polednice (The Noon Witch, or The Noonday Witch), Symphonic Poem for orchestra, Op. 108, B. 196 (1896) by Antonín Dvořák
 Zlatý kolovrat (The Golden Spinning Wheel), Symphonic Poem for orchestra, Op. 109, B. 197 (1896) by Antonín Dvořák
 Štědrý den, Melodrama for narrator and piano or orchestra, Op. 9, H. 198 (1874, 1899) by Zdeněk Fibich
 Holoubek (The Wild Dove), Symphonic Poem for orchestra, Op. 110, B. 198 (1896) by Antonín Dvořák
 Vodník (The Water Goblin), Symphonic Poem for orchestra, Op. 107, B. 195 (1896) by Antonín Dvořák
 Vodník, Melodrama for narrator and orchestra, Op. 15, H. 267 (1883) by Zdeněk Fibich
 Lilie, Melodrama by Otakar Ostrčil
 Lilie, Melodrama for reciter and piano 4-hands, Op. 23 by Eugen Miroslav Rutte
 Kytice, A Tribute to K. J. Erben (2007) by Libor Tinka
Opera
 Vodník, Opera in 4 acts (1937) by Boleslav Vomáčka; libretto by Adolf Wenig

Theatre
 Kytice, a 1972 loose musical theatre adaptation by Jiří Suchý and Ferdinand Havlík (music), one of the most popular pieces the Semafor theatre

References
Citations

Bibliography

(translations)

(secondary sources)

External links
 Full Czech language text of Kytice at Wikisource 
 Several rhymed translations and an interview with the translator Susan Reynolds at Radio Prague website, 19 September 2004: transcript and RealAudio archive
 A Bouquet Full English translation by Marcela Sulak.
 Kytice Full English translation by Susan Reynolds.

Czech poetry
Ballad collections